Mitromorpha volva is a species of sea snail, a marine gastropod mollusk in the family Mitromorphidae.

Description
The length of the shell attains 6 mm, its diameter 2¼ mm.

(Original description) The white shell has an elongate-fusiform shape. It contains 5½ slightly convex whorls. The slightly pronounced ribs are crossed by dense, spiral lirae. The ribs on the body whorl are only little elevated. The aperture is oblong. The columella is a little contorted.

Distribution
This marine species occurs off Port Elizabeth, East Cape, South Africa.

References

External links
 

Endemic fauna of South Africa
volva
Gastropods described in 1892